Downer is an English and Irish surname. Notable people with the surname include:
 Alec Downer (1910–1981), Australian politician and diplomat
 Alexander Downer (born 1951), Australian politician
 Alfred Wallace Downer (1904–1994), Canadian politician
 Billy Downer (born 1956), South African deputy director
 George Downer (1839–1916), Australian lawyer and businessman
 Hunt Downer (born 1946), American politician
 John Downer (1843–1915), Australian Premier and lawyer
 Naleya Downer (born 1980), Jamaican sprinter
 Sidney Downer (1909–1969), Australian journalist and sports writer
 Wally Downer (1904–1994), Canadian politician
 Kristof Downer (born 1975), UK businessman 

 Downer family some members of the notable South Australian family

English-language surnames
Surnames of English origin
Surnames of Irish origin